General Sir Ian Standish Monteith Hamilton,  (16 January 1853 – 12 October 1947) was a senior British Army officer who had an extensive British Imperial military career in the Victorian and Edwardian eras. Hamilton was twice recommended for the Victoria Cross, but on the first occasion was considered too young, and on the second too senior. He was wounded in action at the Battle of Majuba during the First Boer War, which rendered his left hand permanently injured. Near the end of his career, he commanded the Mediterranean Expeditionary Force in the Gallipoli Campaign of the First World War.

Early life
Hamilton's father was Colonel Christian Monteith Hamilton, former commanding officer of the 92nd Highlanders. His mother Corinna was the daughter of the 3rd Viscount Gort. His mother died giving birth to his brother, Vereker, who became a well-known artist. Hamilton received his early formal education at Wellington College, Berkshire. His father then sent him to stay with General Drammers, a Hanoverian who had fought against Prussia.

Military career
Hamilton attended the Royal Military College, Sandhurst in 1870, the first year that entrance to the British Army as an officer was regulated by academic examination rather than by the monetary purchasing of a commission. In 1871 he received a commission as an infantry officer with the Suffolk Regiment, but shortly afterwards transferred to the 2nd Battalion of The Gordon Highlanders, who at that time were on Imperial garrison service in India. On arrival in India Hamilton took part in the Afghan campaign.

During the First Boer War he was present at the Battle of Majuba, where he was wounded and taken prisoner of war by the Boers. He later returned to England to recover, where he was treated as a war hero and introduced to Queen Victoria. In 1882 he was made captain and took part in the Nile Expedition of 1884–1885, being promoted to brevet-major. In Burma 1886–1887 he became brevet lieutenant colonel. In Bengal from 1890 to 1893 held the rank of Colonel and was awarded the Distinguished Service Order in 1891. He took part in the Chitral Expedition as military secretary to Sir George Stuart White, commander in chief of forces in India. From 1895 to 1898 he held the post of Deputy Quarter Master General in India. In 1897–1898 he commanded the third brigade in the Tirah Campaign, where his left arm was wounded by a shell.

He returned to England in April 1898 and was appointed Commandant of the School of Musketry at Hythe.

Second Boer War

Amidst mounting tensions between the United Kingdom and the Boer republics in South Africa Lieutenant General White was dispatched to take command in Natal in September 1899, with Hamilton accompanying him as Chief Staff Officer (Assistant Adjutant General). The Second Boer War broke out shortly after their arrival and Hamilton commanded the infantry at the Battle of Elandslaagte. At the Battle of Ladysmith Hamilton continued to lead his brigade-sized column, but played no role in the fighting. Defeated in the field, White's Natal Field Force was besieged in Ladysmith from the beginning of November. Hamilton was given command of the southern sector of the town's defences and successfully fought off the only major assault on the garrison at the Battle of Wagon Hill in January. For his part in the siege, he was frequently mentioned in despatches.

After the relief of Ladysmith in February Hamilton took command of a brigade of Mounted Infantry, and from April the Mounted Infantry Division. He was promoted to major general, and knighted as a Knight Commander of the Order of the Bath (KCB). The war correspondent Winston Churchill told of his campaign from Bloemfontein to Pretoria in Ian Hamilton's March (London, 1900, reprinted as the second half of The Boer War), having first met Hamilton in 1897 when they sailed on the same ship. Hamilton travelled 400 miles from Bloemfontein to Pretoria fighting 10 major battles with Boer forces (including the battle of Rooiwal) and fourteen minor ones, and was recommended twice for the Victoria Cross (which was considered inappropriate because of his rank).

In May 1901 Hamilton was appointed Military Secretary at the War Office, but the following November he was again asked to return to South Africa as Chief of Staff to the Commander-in-Chief, Lord Kitchener. He arrived in South Africa in late November 1901, and received the local rank of lieutenant general. In April 1902 he took command of the military columns operating in the Western Transvaal. Following the end of hostilities in June 1902, he returned to the UK together with Lord Kitchener on board the SS Orotava, which arrived in Southampton on 12 July. They received an enthusiastic welcome on their arrival to London, with thousands of people lining the streets to watch their procession.

In a despatch dated 23 June 1902, Lord Kitchener wrote the following about his work in South Africa:

Hamilton was promoted to lieutenant general for distinguished service in the field on 22 August 1902. He returned to his post as Military Secretary at the War Office in September 1902, and the same month accompanied Lord Roberts, Commander-in-Chief of the Forces, and St John Brodrick, Secretary of State for War, on a visit to Germany to attend the German army maneuvers as guest of the Emperor Wilhelm. From 1903 to 1904 he was Quartermaster-General to the Forces.

Japan

From 1904 to 1905, Hamilton was the military attaché of the British Indian Army serving with the Japanese army in Manchuria during the Russo-Japanese War. Amongst the several military attachés from Western countries, he was the first to arrive in Japan after the start of the war. He published A Staff Officer's Scrap-Book during the Russo–Japanese War on his experiences and observations during that conflict.

This military confrontation between a well-known European army and a less-familiar Asian army was the first time that the tactics of entrenched positions for infantry were defended with machine guns and artillery. This was the first twentieth-century war in which the technology of warfare became increasingly important, factors which came to dominate the evolution of warfare during the First World War. Hamilton wrote that cavalry was obsolete in such a conflict, regarding their role as better accomplished by mounted infantry. He became a supporter of non-traditional tactics such as night attacks and the use of aircraft. Conversely, the successful Japanese infantry assaults convinced him that superior morale would allow an attacker to overcome prepared defensive positions.

Return to England and Inspector-General of Oversea Forces
Hamilton went on to serve as General Officer Commanding Southern Command between 1905 and 1909 and as Adjutant-General to the Forces between 1909 and 1910.

By 1911 Hamilton had been appointed Inspector-General of Oversea Forces, and by 1913 also, additionally, General Officer Commanding-in-Chief Mediterranean Command, with major-generals in Gibraltar, Malta, and Egypt, plus the forces in the Anglo-Egyptian Sudan and Cyprus seemingly reporting to him. In July 1914 he was returning to the United Kingdom with his appointment about to expire.

First World War
On 5 August 1914, with the declaration of hostilities between Britain and Germany, Hamilton was appointed as the Commander-in-Chief, Home Army. He also became commander of "Central Force", the predominantly Territorial Force military formation which was charged with repelling any seaborne German invasion of the east coast of England in the early part of the war.

Gallipoli campaign

In March 1915, Lord Kitchener appointed Hamilton, aged 62, to the command of the Allied Mediterranean Expeditionary Force, with orders to gain control of the Dardanelles straits from the Ottoman Empire and to capture Constantinople. Whilst a senior and respected officer, perhaps more experienced in different campaigns than most, Hamilton was considered too unconventional, too intellectual, and too friendly with politicians to be given a command on the Western Front. Hamilton was not given a chance to take part in planning the campaign. Intelligence reports on the Ottoman Empire's military defensive capacity were poor and underestimated its strength. Whilst the high command of the Greek Army, which possessed far more detailed knowledge of the Ottoman Empire's military capacity, warned Kitchener that a British Expeditionary Force entering the Eastern Mediterranean theatre would require 150,000 troops to capture Gallipoli, Kitchener concluded that a force of 70,000 men would be adequate to overpower any defensive garrison there.

The plan to take control of the Dardanelles and open a new front in the war had been considered in various forms since 1914. In November of that year, ships from the Royal Navy had shelled its outer forts, causing the magazine at Seddülbahir castle to explode. In December 1914, a Royal Navy submarine entered the channel and sank the Turkish warship Mesudiye at Çanakkale. These early experiences raised in Kitchener's mind the prospect of an easy victory for a more ambitious operation, but as a consequence of them, the Turks had set about laying sea-mines in the straits to interdict Allied warships ships approaching again and strengthened the forts guarding its approaches. On 3 January 1915, the British First Sea Lord, Admiral Fisher, presented a plan to the British Government for a joint naval and army attack, utilizing 75,000 troops, but only on the proviso that it could be launched with little delay. By 21 January 1915, Fisher wrote privately to Admiral Jellicoe that he could not approve the plan unless 200,000 men were available to carry it through. Winston Churchill, as First Lord of the Admiralty, had initially suggested in September 1914 that the operation would need the support of only 50,000 men, a strength of just over two British Army divisions.

Starting on 19 February 1915, British and French warships attempted to take the strait using naval power alone but failed after an abortive attack foundered upon sea mines. Lord Kitchener then decided that an invasion by troops of the Gallipoli peninsula would be required to support the naval operation with a land campaign, led by Hamilton, who became responsible for organising landings there. Hamilton had no specialised landing craft, the disparate troops he had been given had no training for seaborne operations, and supplies for the army had been packed in ways which made them difficult to access for landings. Hamilton believed that the Royal Navy would make further attacks during his campaign; realising its likely losses, however, and fundamentally opposing the idea that tactical losses of its ships in the operation was an acceptable price to pay, the Royal Naval high command declined to mount another attack.

With the Gallipoli Campaign stalled, Hamilton was recalled to London on 16 October 1915, effectively ending his military career.

Later life
In retirement, Hamilton was a leading figure in the ex-servicemen organization, the British Legion, holding the position of Scottish President. He was also a founding member and vice-president of the Anglo-German Association in 1928, which worked to promote rapprochement between Britain and Germany. He maintained a relationship with the Association after Adolf Hitler's rise to power, described himself as "an admirer of the great Adolph Hitler", and dismissed Mein Kampf as a "youthful excess". (In the historian Ian Kershaw's view, however, Hamilton was a pillar of the British Imperial power establishment and not a Nazi supporter, despite his early apparent approval for much of what the early manifestation of Nazi Germany proclaimed). In 1934, at the age of 81, Hamilton was filmed as part of a war documentary film called Forgotten Men.

Hamilton died on 12 October 1947, aged 94, at his home at Hyde Park Gardens in London. His body was buried at Kilmadock Cemetery, in Doune, Stirlingshire, Scotland. In 2013, his grave was found to have fallen into a semi-derelict condition, and it was refurbished by Stirling Council.

Personal life

Hamilton spoke German, French and Hindi, and was considered charming, courtly and kind. He appeared frail yet was full of energy.

In 1887 he married Jean Muir, the daughter of a Glasgow businessman. They originally had no intention of starting a family, but adopted two children after the War.

Along with his professional career, Hamilton was a prolific writer. He published a volume of poetry and a novel contemporarily described as risqué. Examples of his written works include: The Fighting of the Future, Icarus, A Jaunt on a Junk, A Ballad of Hadji, and A Staff Officer's Scrapbook. In the introduction to his Gallipoli Diary, he stated: "There is nothing certain about war, except that one side won't win".

He was a cousin of the diarist James Lees-Milne.

Selected works
Hamilton's known published writings encompass 184 works in 568 publications, in six languages, and 4,455 library holdings.

 
  
 
 
 
 1915 — Sir Ian Hamilton's Despatches from the Dardanelles, etc.
 1919 — The Millennium
 
 
 1923 — The Friends of England; Lectures to Members of the British Legion
 1926 — Now and Then
 1939 — When I was a Boy
 1944 — Listening for the Drums
 1957 — The Commander

Assessments
British Prime Minister H. H. Asquith remarked that he thought that Hamilton had "too much feather in his brain", whereas Charles Bean, a war correspondent who had reported from the scene of the Gallipoli campaign in 1915 and who went on to write Australia's Official History of the 1914–1918 War, considered that Hamilton possessed "a breadth of mind which the army in general does not possess". Writing in his 'Gallipoli Memories', Sir Compton Mackenzie makes it clear that his view was aligned with that of Charles Bean.

Honours, awards and decorations 
Hamilton received the honorary Doctor of Laws (LL.D) from the University of Glasgow in June 1901.

A statue of the then Lt.-Gen Hamilton stands on the Boer War memorial in Cheltenham.

Decorations
DSO : Distinguished Service Order – 1891

Most Honourable Order of the Bath

 CB : Companion – 1896 – Chitral relief force
 KCB : Knight Commander – 29 November 1900 – in recognition of services in connection with the Campaign in South Africa 1899–1900
 GCB : Knight Grand Cross – 1910

Most Distinguished Order of St Michael and St George
 GCMG : Knight Grand Cross – 1919

Foreign
Knight 1st class of the Order of the Crown (Prussia) – during his September 1902 visit to Germany to attend German Army manoeuvres.

Legacy
 Hamilton Preparatory School, in Ladysmith, KwaZulu-Natal, is named after Hamilton.
His medals are currently held by National Museums Scotland, with the miniatures being held by The Gordon Highlanders Museum.

See also
 Military attachés and observers in the Russo-Japanese War

References

Bibliography 

 

 Winston Churchill: Ian Hamilton's march (1900)

Further reading

External links 

 
 
 

 

|-
 

|-
 

|-
 

1853 births
1947 deaths
British military personnel of the First Boer War
British Army personnel of the Second Boer War
British Army generals of World War I
People educated at Wellington College, Berkshire
Knights Grand Cross of the Order of the Bath
Knights Grand Cross of the Order of St Michael and St George
Companions of the Distinguished Service Order
Rectors of the University of Edinburgh
British Army personnel of the Mahdist War
Gordon Highlanders officers
Lancashire Militia officers
British military personnel of the Second Anglo-Afghan War
Graduates of the Royal Military College, Sandhurst
British military personnel of the Tirah campaign
British military personnel of the Chitral Expedition
People of the Russo-Japanese War
British military attachés
British Army generals